NBA TV is an American sports-oriented pay television network owned by the National Basketball Association (NBA) and operated by Warner Bros. Discovery through its sports unit. Dedicated to basketball, the network features exhibition, regular season and playoff game broadcasts from the NBA and related professional basketball leagues, as well as NBA-related content including analysis programs, specials and documentaries.  The network is headquartered in Atlanta, Georgia. The network also serves as the national broadcaster of the NBA G League and WNBA games. NBA TV is the oldest subscription network in North America to be owned or controlled by a professional sports league, having launched on November 2, 1999.

History
The network launched on November 2, 1999 as nba.com TV; the channel, which was renamed NBA TV on February 11, 2003, originally operated from studio facilities housed at NBA Entertainment in Secaucus, New Jersey. The network signed a multi-year carriage agreement with three of the U.S.'s five largest cable providers, Cox Communications, Cablevision and Time Warner Cable, on June 28, 2003; this expanded the network's reach to 45 million pay television households in the U.S., in addition to distribution in 30 countries worldwide. After Time Warner shut down the sports news network CNN/SI in 2002, many cable providers replaced that network with NBA TV.

The network mainly launched with two purposes; to serve as a barker channel for the league's out-of-market sports package NBA League Pass, along with featuring statistical and scoring information which was more easily accessible in the pre-broadband age, and it featured mainly archival content from the NBA Entertainment archives in its upper pane to fill programming time. As time went on, the network added more programming, including international basketball leagues and programming from FIBA usually unseen in the American market. The programming mix and channel format changed around the same time of the CNN/SI shutdown.

On October 8, 2007, it was reported that the National Basketball Association would transfer the channel's operations to Time Warner's Turner Sports division (operated by the company's Turner Broadcasting System subsidiary).

Turner took over the channel's operations on October 28, 2008, and began using the same announcers and analysts used on TNT's NBA telecasts. Analysis and news programming also received an upgrade, with production of the programs being relocated to Studio B at Turner Studios in Atlanta, Georgia, located adjacent to Studio J, where TNT's post-game program Inside the NBA is broadcast. The repeats of NBA games on TBS and TNT began in 2009, as NBA Classics.

Carriage agreements
On April 16, 2009, DirecTV announced that it had reached a carriage agreement with the NBA to continue carrying NBA TV, moving it (and out-of-market sports package NBA League Pass) from the satellite provider's Sports Pack add-on tier to its lower-priced Choice Xtra base package on October 1, 2009. DirecTV believed the move will make the channel available to an additional eight million subscribers.

On June 4, 2009, Comcast announced that it had reached an agreement with the NBA to move the channel from the cable provider's Sports Entertainment Package to its basic level Digital Classic package, by the start of the 2009–10 NBA season. Like DirecTV, Comcast estimated that an additional eight million customers would effectively gain access to the channel. Verizon FiOS added the channel and NBA League Pass to its systems on September 23, 2009. The network also signed new multi-year agreements with Time Warner Cable, Cablevision and Dish Network on October 22, 2009, as well as a renewal agreement with Cox Communications earlier in the year.

With all of the above carriage deals, the NBA estimates that it would increase NBA TV's overall subscriber reach to 45 million pay television homes. On October 29, 2010, AT&T U-verse reached a carriage deal to carry the channel's standard and high definition feeds.

NBA TV is not available to legacy Charter Communications customers using outdated billing plans, which carried the network as NBA.com TV prior to 2004, due to unknown carriage conflicts; NBA League Pass was likewise unavailable on Charter until a broader rollout for the 2020–21 season began (on May 18, 2016, Charter acquired Time Warner Cable and Bright House Networks for $78.7 billion, which both carried the network). NBA TV has been available to Charter households where available since February 2017, if a customer switches to the new 'Spectrum' billing plan which united Charter, Time Warner Cable and Bright House Networks under the Spectrum branding (this is all likely unrelated to Charter's inherited naming rights of the Charlotte Hornets' home arena, the Spectrum Center).

Programming
NBA TV offers news programs devoted to basketball daily, in addition to programs showcasing the lives of individual basketball players, documentaries focusing on a particular NBA team during the season and archived broadcasts of well-known games.

NBA TV carries at least 90 regular season games per season, which typically air four days a week during the NBA season (mainly on Mondays, Thursdays and Saturdays, although occasional Wednesday, Friday and Sunday games may air in the event that ESPN does not hold rights to coverage on those nights), as well as some first-round playoff games. It also carries its own coverage of the NBA Draft.

Live games on NBA TV are subject to local blackout restrictions, since NBA TV (despite being owned by the league) does not hold the exclusive broadcast rights to any of its games. Games carried by NBA TV are also carried by each team's local rights holder, either a regional sports network or a broadcast television station.

The network also shows international games, typically on Saturday evenings, with special emphasis on the Euroleague and the Maccabi Tel Aviv team from Israel. In April 2005, NBA TV televised the Chinese Basketball Association finals for the first time.

The channel's flagship program is NBA Gametime Live, a program focusing on news headlines within the NBA and related leagues (including the WNBA and G League), highlights and look-ins at games currently in progress presented by a host and studio analysts. The show airs live six days a week, deferring any TNT game nights outside the playoffs to repeating that evening's edition of Inside the NBA. An edited 90-minute version of the broadcast is repeated during the overnight and early morning hours.

On October 11, 2017, it was announced that the Players Only franchise, which made its debut last season on TNT, will show live games on NBA TV, starting October 24, 2017 and every Tuesday after that, for the first half of the 2017–18 season before transitioning to TNT for the remainder of the regular season starting January 23, 2018. After the cancellation of Players Only in 2019, Tuesday (first half) and Monday (second half) night games on NBA TV were rebranded as NBA TV Center Court, with Brian Anderson handling the Tuesday night games and Spero Dedes the Monday night games. They are joined alongside Greg Anthony and Dennis Scott. With TNT moving its marquee games to Tuesdays in 2021 during the NFL regular season (thus avoiding competition with Thursday Night Football), NBA TV Center Court was moved to Monday nights, though it would continue to air select broadcasts on Tuesdays when TNT has other programming commitments.

Beginning 2021, NBA TV began to broadcast a package of men's and women's Southwestern Athletic Conference (SWAC) college basketball games in February as an observance of Black History Month. This marked NBA TV's first broadcasts of college basketball games.

List of programs broadcast by NBA TV
 10 Before Tip
 3DTV
 Beyond The Paint
 Books and Basketball
 Courtside Cinema
 Game Of The Day
 Hardwood Classics (1999–present)
 High Tops: Plays of the Month
 Inside the NBA (2003–present) (encore telecasts within 12 hours of original airing on TNT)
 NBA 360
 NBA Access with Ahmad Rashad
 NBA Action (2003–present)
 NBA Basketballography
 NBA.com Fantasy Insider
 NBA CrunchTime – focuses on live NBA games till the buzzer, includes CrunchTime Alert, similar to NBA Scores
 NBA Fit
 NBA Gametime Live (2008–present)
 NBA Gametime Live Specials (e.g. mock draft, free agent updates, season previews, trade deadline updates, playoff previews)
 NBA Home Video
 NBA Hoop Party
 NBA Inside Stuff (2013–2016)
 NBA Jam
 NBA Journeys
 NBA Presents
 NBA Slideshow
 NBA Specials
 NBA TV Top 10 Games of the Week
 NBA TV Marquee Matchup
 NBA TV Originals
 NBA Vault
 NBA Wired
 Open Court
 Playoff Playback
 Real NBA
 Real Training Camp
 Shaqtin' a Fool (2013–present)
 The Beat
 The Starters (2006–2019)
 Vintage NBA
 WNBA Action

High definition
NBA TV HD is a 1080i high-definition simulcast feed of NBA TV that is available on most providers. All studio programs and original programs are shot in HD, and all live games and recent game rebroadcasts are televised in HD.

Personalities
The studio host and analysts vary on each night's broadcast of NBA Gametime.

Studio hosts and play-by-play
 Andre Aldridge (2005–present)
 Brian Anderson (2014–present)
 Kevin Calabro (2012–2014, 2022–present)
 Vince Cellini (2009–present)
 Scott Cole (2018–present)
 Spero Dedes (2003–present)
 Ian Eagle (2012–present)
 Kevin Frazier (2021–present)
 Michael Grady (2021–present)
 Jared Greenberg (2011–present)
 Bob Fitzgerald (2020–present)
 Ernie Johnson (2008–present)
 Rick Kamla (2002–present)
 Kristen Ledlow (2016–present) 
 Allie LaForce (2018–present)
 Adam Lefkoe (2020–present)
 Joel Meyers (2020–present)
 Chris Miles (2018–present)
 Ro Parrish (2016–present)
 Pete Pranica (2018–present)
 Ahmad Rashad (2007–present) 
 Stephanie Ready (2018–present)
 Kevin Ray (2019–present)
 Casey Stern (2015–present)
 Matt Winer (2010–present)

Studio analysts and color commentators
 David Aldridge (2008–present)
 Greg Anthony (2010–present)
 Brent Barry (2009–present)
 Vinny Del Negro (2013–present)
 Rick Fox (2010–present)
 Mike Fratello (2008–present)
 Channing Frye (2020–present)
 Brendan Haywood (2016–present)
 Grant Hill (2016–present)
 Stu Jackson (2016–present)
 Bernard King (2010–present)
 Brevin Knight (2009–present)
 Kyle Korver (2021–present)
 Kevin McHale (2009–2011; 2016–present)
 Sam Mitchell (2008–2010; 2013–2015, 2016–present)
 Shaquille O'Neal (2011–present)
 Candace Parker (2018–present)
 Morris Peterson (2011–present)
 Dennis Scott (2009–present)
 Kenny Smith (2008–present)
 Steve Smith (2008–present)
 Isiah Thomas (2012–present)
 Dwyane Wade (2019–present)
 Chris Webber (2008–present)

Contributors
 Joe Borgia
 Sekou Smith
 Lang Whitaker

Other hosts
The Starters (2006–2019)
 Leigh Ellis
 Trey Kerby
 Tas Melas
 J. E. Skeets

NBA Inside Stuff (2013–2016)
 Grant Hill
 Kristen Ledlow

Former hosts and analysts
 Marv Albert (2010)
 Derrick Coleman (2009)
 Antonio Davis (2008–2012)
 LaPhonso Ellis (2009)
 Marc Fein (2008–2011)
 Lawrence Frank (2010)
 Matt Harpring (2010)
 Lionel Hollins (2013)
 Eddie Jordan (2008–2009)
 Tracy McGrady (2013) 
 Kyle Montgomery (2009–2013)
 Gary Payton (2008–2009)
 Scot Pollard (2009–2014)
 Syleys Roberts (2012–2015)
 Byron Scott (2013)
 Eric Snow (2008–2010)
 Jerry Stackhouse (2010–2016)
 Reggie Theus (2008–2009)
 Stan Van Gundy (2019–2020)

NBA TV International
NBA TV International is a feed of NBA TV available in countries outside the United States, utilizing the same studio for analysis and commentary segments and taped programming (except for FIBA events and highlights), but largely airs a different lineup of games than the U.S. channel. NBA TV International shows one or two live regular season games per day, with the delayed coverage of selected playoffs that not broadcast live by NBA TV, all conference semis, finals and the Finals, as well as All-Star live games and contests and most nationally televised U.S. games (such as those seen on ABC, TNT, ESPN and US feed of NBA TV); the rights to those games are instead sold to domestic television networks in each territory. As of 2022, NBA TV International can be seen in 100 countries via the following partners:
 Sky Italia (Italy)
 Sky Deutschland (Austria and Germany)
 Sky Switzerland (Switzerland)
 DirecTV (South America)
 Canal+ (France)
 TV8 until 2017; Saran Holding since 2017 (Turkey)
 NTV Plus (Russia)
 OTE TV (Greece)
 Flow (Argentina)
 NOS since 2015; MEO since February 2017 (Portugal)
 Telkom Indonesia (Indonesia)
 Rakuten (Japan)
 TrueVisions (Thailand)
 Tencent (Mainland China)
 SK Telecom, KT and LG U+ (South Korea)
 Starhub (Singapore)
 Astro (Brunei and Malaysia)
 StarTimes (2013-2016); Kwesé Sports (2017-2019)   (Sub-Saharan Africa) 
 Mts TV (Serbia)
 BT Consumer, Sky UK and Ireland and Virgin Media (United Kingdom and Ireland)
 Kujtesa; ArtMotion; IPKO (Kosovo)

NBA TV Canada, a Canadian version of the channel, carries some of the same game broadcasts as the flagship U.S. service, ESPN, and TNT instead of the secondary game package found on NBA TV International.

on October 16, 2010, NBA Premium TV was launched in the Philippines. It is a redirect broadcast of NBA TV and airs locally televised and nationally televised games in the United States. It went defunct on October 1, 2019.

In February 2012, NBA TV International was made available on NBA.TV as an internet subscription channel outside the United States.

On beIN Channels Network in the Arab world, NBA TV is not available, though beIN Sports NBA airs some of the same games.

On July 31, 2020, the Philippine version of the channel, NBA TV Philippines was launched.

Past playoff broadcast criticism
NBA TV was criticized in the past for its first-round playoff coverage merely passing down the broadcast of a game from a regional sports network for national broadcast, amplifying the chosen team's broadcast and bias for said team to a national level. Beginning with the 2011–12 playoffs, NBA TV began to produce a full and neutral national broadcast for those games.

See also
 List of current National Basketball Association broadcasters
 NBL TV

References

External links
 NBA TV official website
 NBA TV HD schedules

English-language television stations in the United States
Television channels and stations established in 1999
National Basketball Association on television
Sports television networks in the United States
Turner Sports
1999 establishments in the United States
Warner Bros. Discovery networks
Men's mass media
Men's interest channels